Jolgeh-ye Mazhan Rural District is in Jolgeh-ye Mazhan District of Khusf County, South Khorasan province, Iran. At the National Census of 2006, its population (as a part of the former Khusf District of Birjand County) was 4,280 in 1,220 households. There were 4,536 inhabitants in 1,360 households at the following census of 2011.

At the most recent census of 2016, the population of the rural district was 3,520 in 1,170 households, by which time the district had been separated from the county and Khusf County established with two new districts. The largest of its 89 villages was Mazhan, with 476 people.

References 

Khusf County

Rural Districts of South Khorasan Province

Populated places in South Khorasan Province

Populated places in Khusf County